Lycoperdina is a genus of handsome fungus beetles in the family Endomychidae. There are about 16 described species in Lycoperdina.

Species
These 16 species belong to the genus Lycoperdina:

 Lycoperdina banatica Ganglbauer, 1899
 Lycoperdina bovistae (Fabricius, 1792)
 Lycoperdina canariensis Gillerfors, 1991
 Lycoperdina crassicornis Reitter, 1880
 Lycoperdina ferruginea LeConte, 1824
 Lycoperdina gomerae Franz, 1979
 Lycoperdina hiranoi Sogoh & Yoshitomi, 2017
 Lycoperdina humeralis Wollaston, 1864
 Lycoperdina immaculata Latreille, 1807
 Lycoperdina maritima Reitter, 1884
 Lycoperdina penicillata Marseul, 1868
 Lycoperdina pulvinata Reitter, 1884
 Lycoperdina sanchezi Oromi & Garcia, 1987
 Lycoperdina smirnoviorum Gusakov, 2017
 Lycoperdina succincta (Linnaeus, 1767)
 Lycoperdina validicornis Gerstäcker, 1858

References

Further reading

External links

 

Endomychidae
Articles created by Qbugbot
Coccinelloidea genera